Throughout August 2007, various teams prepared for the Rugby World Cup in France with a short series of test matches, primarily in the Northern Hemisphere and involving the RBS Six Nations sides. In addition, South Africa played one test in Scotland following the 2007 Tri Nations and Argentina one test in their home country and one in Wales. The tests were effectively a replacement for the usual Autumn international series in November which does not take place in World Cup years.

Note: this article does not include international results not involving at least one side who had qualified for the 2007 World Cup.

Saturday, 21 July

Saturday, 28 July

Thursday, 2 August

Saturday, 4 August

Monday, 6 August

Friday, 10 August

Saturday, 11 August

In this match, Fabien Pelous equalled Philippe Sella for most caps for France, with 111.

Tuesday, 14 August

Wednesday, 15 August

Thursday, 16 August

Friday 17 August

Saturday, 18 August

 Fabien Pelous set a new France record with his 112th cap.

Sunday, 19 August

Tuesday 21 August

Friday, 24 August

Saturday, 25 August

Japan wing Daisuke Ohata, the all-time world leader in international tries, was injured and was ruled out of the World Cup after he tore his left Achilles tendon in the match.

Sunday, 26 August

External links
 List of all warm-up matches involving national teams and clubs (22 October 2009)

Notes 

2007
Warm-up tests
2007–08 in European rugby union
2007–08 in Japanese rugby union
2007 in Oceanian rugby union
2007 in South American rugby union
2007 in North American rugby union
2007 in African rugby union